Enele is a given name. Notable people with the name include:

 Enele Maʻafu ( 1816–1881), Tongan chief
 Enele Malele (born 1990), Fijian rugby union player
 Enele Sopoaga (born 1956), Tuvaluan diplomat and politician
 Enele Taufa (born 1984), Tongan rugby union player